Rhodoprasina nenulfascia is a species of moth of the family Sphingidae. It is known from southern Tibet near the borders with India and Bhutan.

References

Rhodoprasina
Moths described in 1997